Yvonne Chuan Fang Su is a Hong Kong evolutionary biologist who is notable for her co-discovery of Pseuduvaria bruneiensis and Pseuduvaria borneensis. Her doctoral work at the University of Hong Kong focused on the phylogeny of the flowering plant genus Pseuduvaria. Her work as a faculty member at Duke–NUS Medical School focuses on the evolution of viruses.

Legacy 
She is an authority for the following taxa:

Pseuduvaria bruneiensis
Pseuduvaria borneensis
Pseuduvaria clemensiae
Pseuduvaria coriacea
Pseuduvaria cymosa
Pseuduvaria fragrans
Pseuduvaria glabrescens
Pseuduvaria glossopetala
Pseuduvaria kingiana
Pseuduvaria luzonensis
Pseuduvaria macrocarpa
Pseuduvaria megalopus
Pseuduvaria mindorensis
Pseuduvaria obliqua

References 

Living people
Year of birth missing (living people)
Alumni of the University of Hong Kong
Women evolutionary biologists
Hong Kong people
Hong Kong biologists